This list contains all cultural property of regional significance (class B) in the canton of Geneva from the 2014 Swiss Inventory of Cultural Property of National and Regional Significance. It is sorted by municipality.
The geographic coordinates provided are in the Swiss coordinate system as given in the Inventory.

Avully

Avusy

Bardonnex

Bellevue

Bernex

Cartigny

Chancy

Choulex

Collex-Bossy

Collonge-Bellerive

Cologny

Confignon

Dardagny

Genthod

Gy

Hermance

Jussy

Laconnex

Lancy

Le Grand-Saconnex

Meinier

Meyrin

Onex

Plan-les-Ouates

Presinge

Russin

Satigny

Soral

Troinex

Vandoeuvres

Vernier

Versoix

Veyrier

See also 
List of cultural property of national significance in Switzerland: Geneva

External links
 Swiss Inventory of Cultural Property of National and Regional Significance, 2009 edition:
PDF documents: Class A objects
PDF documents: Class B objects
Geographic information system

Cultural property of regional significance in Geneva